Tetracha globosicollis is a species of tiger beetle that was described by W. Horn in 1913.

References

Beetles described in 1913
Cicindelidae